Chinedu Ede (born 5 February 1987) is a German former professional footballer who played as a winger.

Career 
Ede began his career with Berlin AK 07 and joined later the Reinickendorfer Füchse. In 1998 was scouted by Hertha BSC. He initially played for the youth team, scoring 21 goals in 39 games for the U19, before being promoted to the senior squad on 6 April 2006. He played then two years for the senior side of Hertha BSC. On 21 May 2008, Ede signed a four-year contract until 30 June 2011 with MSV Duisburg. After playing ten matches and scoring two goals in two-and-a-half years, he left Duisburg and returned to Berlin to sign for Union Berlin.

On 23 July 2012, he signed a four-year contract with 1. FSV Mainz 05 until 30 June 2016. On 16 August 2014, he signed a one-year loan contract with Anorthosis Famagusta. Mainz also granted Anorthosis a subsequent purchase option.

On 27 August 2015, Edu moved to Eredivisie club Twente, where he signed a two-year contract until 30 June 2017. After his contract with Twente expired and an extension option was not triggered by the club, he joined Bangkok United in Thailand in June 2017.

In late 2017, Edu returned to Germany and signed a contract with the Regionalliga Nordost club VSG Altglienicke. There, he eventually retired from football in the summer of 2019.

Personal life
Chinedu has a Nigerian father which made him eligible to play for Nigeria.

Honours
Germany U21
UEFA Under-21 Championship: 2009

References

External links
 

1987 births
Living people
Footballers from Berlin
German footballers
German sportspeople of Nigerian descent
Germany youth international footballers
Germany under-21 international footballers
German expatriate footballers
Association football forwards
Füchse Berlin Reinickendorf players
Hertha BSC players
Hertha BSC II players
MSV Duisburg players
1. FC Union Berlin players
1. FSV Mainz 05 players
1. FC Kaiserslautern players
Anorthosis Famagusta F.C. players
FC Twente players
Bundesliga players
2. Bundesliga players
Cypriot First Division players
Eredivisie players
Expatriate footballers in Cyprus
Expatriate footballers in the Netherlands
3. Liga players
VSG Altglienicke players